TV2/Nord is one of TV 2's eight regional services. The service's headquarters are in Aabybro although it has had previous offices in Frederikshavn, Hjørring and Hobro. The station broadcasts news and other content. It broadcasts to people in the northern part of Jutland, Greenland and in the Faroe Islands. Content is also produced by TV2/Nord.

See also
 TV 2

References

External links
 TV2/Nord Official Site

Television stations in Denmark
Television channels and stations established in 1989
Mass media in Aabybro